Holm Mills may refer to:

Holm Mills, Hampshire, village in Hampshire, England
Holm Mills (building),  building in Holm, Inverness